"Fuckin' Perfect" (stylized "Perfect" on the clean version, and as F**kin' Perfect on the main cover) is a song by American singer Pink from her first greatest hits album Greatest Hits... So Far!!! (2010). It was released on December 14, 2010, by Jive Records as the album's second single. Written by Pink with Max Martin and Shellback, the track is a power ballad that encourages people to accept each other for their true identities.

Pink has stated that the main inspiration behind the track is her husband, Carey Hart. Its music video, directed by longtime collaborator Dave Meyers, delivers a message against depression, self-harm, and suicide. In November 2011, the song garnered a Grammy Award nomination for Best Pop Solo Performance. "Fuckin' Perfect" peaked at number two on the Billboard Hot 100, becoming Pink's eleventh top-10 single in the United States. The song also peaked at number two in Canada, Hungary, New Zealand, and Poland.

In 2011, "Fuckin' Perfect" was ranked at number 14 on the "Top 40 Year-End Chart", behind her previous single "Raise Your Glass", based on Mediabase.

Background and composition
"Fuckin' Perfect" was written by Pink, Max Martin and Shellback and produced by Martin and Shellback. The Swedish pair has collaborated with Pink on several of her previous hits including "So What", "Please Don't Leave Me", and "Raise Your Glass".

The clean version recorded for radio is titled "Perfect".

The song is a pop rock and soft rock ballad track containing elements contemporary R&B. It is written in the key of G major in common time with a tempo of 92 beats per minute, featuring guitar, crashing cymbals, simple synth drum beats and a reverberating string section. The song follows the I–V–vi–IV progression (G–D–Em–C), and Pink's vocal range spanning from G3 to D5.

Critical reception
The song received critical acclaim from music critics. Bill Lamb of About.com gave the song 4.5 out of 5 stars, praising the "Serious but uplifting lyrics", commenting: "It has just enough edginess to move Pink away from bland middle of the road territory. Finally, the melody and arrangement make the song instantly memorable and familiar."

Music video

Background
Filming of the music video began on December 5, 2010, during Pink's first few weeks of pregnancy. The music video focuses primarily on the life of a woman who overcame several struggles to become a successful artist. The lead role was played by Tina Majorino, as confirmed by Pink via Twitter and Facebook, describing her as "insanely talented".

"Fuckin' Perfect" was directed by Dave Meyers, who worked with Pink on twelve videos before, including her VMA winner "Stupid Girls". It premiered on January 19, 2011, on MTV and Pink's official channel.

Reception
Billboard talked about the video in two different, and largely positive, reviews and described it as "controversial", saying, "Choosing to title her new single 'Fuckin' Perfect' and then open its video with graphic depictions of sex and bloody scenarios of cutting and suicide, P!nk knew her latest projects would ignite controversy. And that's just the way she wants it, because in this particular case, the 31-year-old singer's in-your-face approach is to ensure the message in the music isn't lost or ignored."

In the second review, Monica Herrera begins saying, "If P!nk's new music video for 'Fuckin' Perfect' doesn't make you cry or cringe at some point, you've got thicker skin than we do." She also commented on a particular scene in the video, adding, "Pink video's story directly just once, when she toasts to the girl's newfound happiness from across a crowded room...and it's enough to make you want to raise your glass right along with them."

MTV praised the video, giving a "hats off" to Pink, while saying the video was a "moving call to awareness about a growing problem surrounding depression, numbness and powerlessness that leads to cutting and suicide. Her intention, as usual, is to ruffle a few feathers and shake a few sleepers as she points out 'You can't move mountains by whispering at them.'" The video was nominated for Best Video with a Message at the 2011 MTV Video Music Awards, but eventually lost to Lady Gaga's "Born This Way".

Chart performance
On November 28, 2010, the song debuted at number ten in Australia, coinciding with the release of her greatest hits album, Greatest Hits... So Far!!!. The song's charting gave Pink her eighteenth top ten single in the country. It has since been certified gold by the Australian Recording Industry Association for sales of 35,000 units.

In the United Kingdom, the song debuted at number 71 on the chart issued on November 27, 2010. The next week the song dropped out of the chart, but re-entered at number 21 with the release of its music video and leaped to number 11 the following week. It peaked at number 10 on February 27, 2011.

"Fuckin' Perfect" was released in the United States in December 2010. It had earlier bubbled under the Hot 100 at number 20 and then dropped out. It officially debuted at number 86 and then dropped out of the chart. A week later, it became the most added song on the radio in the entire country, therefore it re-entered the chart at number 57. One week later, it jumped to number 30, as the week's Airplay Gainer. The song soared from number 30 to number 11 that week with the Digital Gainer accolades for a second consecutive week.

On the issue dated February 2, 2011, "Fuckin' Perfect" reached number two on the Billboard Hot 100, behind "Grenade" by Bruno Mars. It became Pink's eleventh top 10 hit in the United States. The song reached number 1 on the Hot Digital Songs chart, with 241,000 copies sold, making it her second song to top that chart, after "So What" in 2008. On February 3, 2011, Billboard stated that the song was likely to top the Hot 100 on the chart issue of February 19, 2011. However, the predictions were incorrect and the song fell to number 4 while Wiz Khalifa's "Black and Yellow" topped the chart. Despite the false predictions for the February 19 issue and the song's descent on the Hot 100, Billboard chart experts considered the song a nominee to become the chart's 1,000th number 1 song in its 52-year history, it competed against Lady Gaga's "Born This Way" and the Glee Cast's, who also covered the song later, nine tracks that were released digitally following the February 6 and February 8 episodes. The February 26 issue of the Hot 100 revealed that "Born This Way" earned the milestone, debuting atop the chart and becoming its 1,000th number 1 song.

On the Billboard chart week of March 26, 2011, "Fuckin' Perfect" reached number one on both the Pop Songs and Adult Pop Songs charts, which at the time, gave Pink the record for most number ones on both charts. On Pop Songs, Pink ties Lady Gaga for second most number 1's with seven, while on Adult Pop Songs she ties Nickelback for the most, with five number 1 hits.

The song held the Digital Gainer certification for three consecutive weeks, the longest streak since Leona Lewis' "Bleeding Love" (2008). It continues its Airplay chart ascent and has so far peaked at number 4 with 55 million impressions and has so far collected more than two million digital units in the USA.
In the week ending March 12, 2011, the song jumped from number 6 to number 4 making it the first time that two songs including the word "fuck" in their titles are in the top 5 as "Fuck You" by Cee Lo Green was number 2 in that week, too. The issue also featured Enrique Iglesias' hit single "Tonight (I'm Fuckin' You)", which was also within the Top 10 that week, marking three simultaneous Top 10 hits with the word "fuck". However, "Tonight" was credited on the Hot 100 with its more popular clean version, "Tonight (I'm Lovin' You)". "Fuckin' Perfect" sold 2,497,000 digital copies in 2011 and became the 27th best-selling song of the year in the United States. The song has sold over 3 million downloads as of May 2013.

The song topped German airplay charts, becoming Pink's eighth consecutive single to do so and increasing her previously broken record for the most consecutive number one singles in Germany.

Track listing
 Digital download
 "F**kin' Perfect" – 3:33
 "Whataya Want from Me" – 3:46
 "Perfect" – 3:33
 German CD single
 "F**kin' Perfect" – 3:33
 "Whataya Want from Me" – 3:46
 Australian digital download EP
 "F**kin' Perfect" – 3:33
 "Whataya Want from Me" – 3:46
 "Perfect" – 3:33
 "F**kin' Perfect" (music video) – 4:07

Remixes
F**kin' Perfect (7th Heaven Radio Edit) - 3:12
F**kin' Perfect (Liam Keegan Extended Mix) - 5:44
F**kin' Perfect (Liam Keegan Radio Edit) - 3:29

Personnel
Vocals, songwriting – Pink, Max Martin, Shellback
Production and recording – Max Martin, Shellback
Keyboards – Max Martin
Drums, guitar and bass – Shellback
Assistant recording – Sal "El Rey" Ojeda
Mixing – Serban Ghenea
Mix engineer – John Hanes
Assistant mix engineer – Tim Roberts

Source:

Charts and certifications

Weekly charts

Year-end charts

Certifications

Release history

Radio adds

Purchasable release

References

2010 singles
Pink (singer) songs
Songs written by Max Martin
Song recordings produced by Max Martin
Songs written by Shellback (record producer)
Pop ballads
Contemporary R&B ballads
Song recordings produced by Shellback (record producer)
Music videos directed by Dave Meyers (director)
2010s ballads
LaFace Records singles
Sony Music singles
Jive Records singles
2010 songs
Songs written by Pink (singer)
Songs containing the I–V-vi-IV progression